The 2008 Portuguese Social Democratic Party leadership election was held on 31 May 2008. This was a snap leadership election following the surprise resignation of then party leader Luís Filipe Menezes, elected just seven months before in September 2007, from the party's leadership. 

Menezes was facing heavy internal criticism for his leadership and opposition strategy but, nonetheless, his resignation surprised party members and structures. Four candidates entered in this snap race: Manuela Ferreira Leite, Pedro Passos Coelho, Pedro Santana Lopes and Mário Patinha Antão. 

On election day, Ferreira Leite won the leadership by capturing almost 38% of the votes, while Passos Coelho got 31% of the votes and Santana Lopes polled just below 30%. Patinha Antão polled well bellow 1%, just 0.7% of the party members votes.

Manuela Ferreira Leite became the first woman to lead a major political party in Portuguese history.

Ferreira Leite would lead the PSD to victory in the 2009 European Parliament election in Portugal, but was defeated in the 2009 general elections held in the fall of the same year.

Candidates

Opinion polls

All voters

PSD voters

Results

See also
 Social Democratic Party (Portugal)
 List of political parties in Portugal
 Elections in Portugal

References

External links
PSD Official Website

2008 in Portugal
Political party leadership elections in Portugal
2008 elections in Portugal
Portuguese Social Democratic Party leadership election